The 2016 Ottawa Redblacks season was the third season for the team in the Canadian Football League. The Redblacks finished in 1st place in the East Division with an 8–9–1 record. This was the first time in CFL history that a team with a losing record finished first in their division.

The club failed to match their 12–6 record from the previous season; nevertheless, with their week 19 win in Winnipeg against the Blue Bombers the Redblacks repeated as regular season East Division champions, earning a bye to and the right to host the 2016 East Final in the process.

The Redblacks' season featured the first-ever Grey Cup rematch to take place in an earlier round of the playoffs as the 2015 champion Edmonton Eskimos qualified as a crossover team for the East Division playoffs and advanced to the Eastern Final. The Redblacks avenged their 2015 Grey Cup loss with a 35–23 victory over Edmonton to earn the right to play in the 104th Grey Cup. At BMO Field in Toronto, the Redblacks won the first championship for an Ottawa CFL team since the Rough Riders did it in 1976.

Off-season

Open tryout sessions 
On February 2, 2016, the Redblacks announced they would be holding open tryouts across North America during the spring. The dates and locations are listed in the table below:

Free-agency 
Prior to the start of free-agency at 12:00pm ET on February 9, 2016, the RedBlacks extended the contracts of some significant players. They brought back defensive lineman Zack Evans, wide-receiver Chris Williams and linebacker Damaso Munoz.

Additions 
 Ottawa made a big splash on the first day of free-agency when they signed highly coveted former-Argos QB Trevor Harris. Harris played very well in 17 games for the Argos in 2015; completing 71% of his passes attempts with 33 touchdowns and 19 interceptions for 4,354 yards. Harris was expected to be the back-up quarterback behind the then 41-year old, 2015 Most Outstanding Player, Henry Burris.
 Veteran national defensive back Ryan Hinds agreed to terms with Ottawa in the middle of February. Hinds spent his first seven CFL seasons between the Tiger-Cats and the Eskimos. However, Hinds decided to retire citing that "his heart wasn't in it and he wasn't going to play anymore".
 Former Oakland Raiders and New York Giants wide receiver Juron Criner signed with the Redblacks on April 14 in time for training camp. Following a successful pre-season Criner made the final roster.

Losses 
 Star defensive end Justin Capicciotti signed with the Saskatchewan Roughriders on February 10. Capicciotti had been one of Ottawa's best pass-rushers in the previous two seasons, totaling 23 sacks and just shy of 100 tackles. 
 Also on February 10, starting running back Jeremiah Johnson signed with the BC Lions. In two seasons with the Redblacks Johnson saw action in 15 games (missing 8 games due to injury in 2015), carrying the ball 135 times for 686 yards (5.0 average) with 11 rushing touchdowns.
 Veteran defensive back Jovon Johnson signed with the Montreal Alouettes. Javon Johnson was an Eastern All-Star in 2015 and was one of the leaders on the defensive side of the ball.
 Offensive tackle Colin Kelly signed a contract with the San Francisco 49ers of the NFL. Kelly played 18 games in 2015 for Ottawa at right tackle.
 Veteran defensive lineman Keith Shologan signed with the Winnipeg Blue Bombers. Shologon contributed 7 sacks during the 2015 campaign.
 Defensive lineman Shawn Lemon was released by the Redblacks following the conclusion of the 2015 season so he could pursue NFL opportunities. He ultimately signed with the Saskatchewan Roughriders in January.

CFL draft 
The 2016 CFL Draft took place on May 10, 2016. The Redblacks had nine selections in the eight-round draft after acquiring Saskatchewan's sixth and seventh-round picks in exchange for Maurice Price and their own sixth-round pick.

Training camp 
Non-mandatory spring mini-camp was held on April 24–26 at TD Place stadium. The sessions were open for the public to view. Mandatory training camp took place between May 29 and through June 19. First-year CFL players had three practices prior to the official training camp (May 25 through 27). The majority of practices took place at TD Place Stadium, with two at Carleton University and one at Stade Mont-Bleu in Gatineau, Quebec. The team conducted a "mock-game" as part of their training camp on June 5. This was the first training camp season in which the Redblacks had priority at TD Place, as the stadium was under construction in 2014 and hosting the 2015 FIFA Women's World Cup last year.

Preseason 

 Games played with white uniforms.

Regular season

Standings

Schedule

 Games played with colour uniforms.
 Games played with white uniforms.

Post-season

Schedule 

 Games played with colour uniforms.

Over 40,000 fans attended the Grey Cup parade at Lansdowne Park two days following the game.

Team

Roster

Coaching staff

References

2016 Canadian Football League season by team
Ottawa Redblacks seasons
Ottawa Redblacks
2010s in Ottawa
Grey Cup championship seasons